Sina may refer to:

Relating to China
 Chin (China), or Sina, old Chinese form of the Sanskrit name Cina
 Shina (word), or Sina, archaic Japanese word for China
 Sinae, Latin name for China

Places
 Sina, Albania, or Sinë, village in Dibër County, Albania
 Sina, Iran, a village in Isfahan Province, Iran
 Sena, Iran, also romanized as Sina, a village in Bushehr Province, Iran
 Sina Rural District, in East Azerbaijan Province, Iran
 Sina District, in  San Antonio de Putina Province, Peru

People
 Ali Sina (activist), pseudonym of the founder of several anti-Islam and anti-Muslim websites
 Sina Ashouri (born 1988), an Iranian soccer-player
 Ibn Sīnā (c. 980 – 1037), Avicenna, a Persian physician, philosopher, and scientist
 Elvis Sina (born 1978), an Albanian soccer-player
 Jaren Sina (born 1994), Portugal-born American basketball player of Kosovar origin
 Melek Sina Baydur (born 1948), Turkish retired woman diplomat and former Ambassador of Turkey 
 Than Sina, Cambodian politician

Companies
 Sina Corp, Chinese online media company
 Sina Bank, a private Iranian bank

Art
 Sina and the Eel, a Samoan myth of origin
 Society for Indecency to Naked Animals, a satirical hoax perpetuated by Alan Abel
 "Sina", a song by Brazilian singer Djavan
 "Soulfood To Go (Sina)", English title of a cover of this song by Manhattan Transfer (band)

Military
 Sina-class fast attack craft, major Iranian naval production project
 Sina-1, an Iranian satellite launched on a Russian rocket in October 2005
 Sina 7 (frigate), an Iranian frigate launched in November 2012

See also
 Shina (disambiguation)
 Sinai (disambiguation)
 Sino (disambiguation)
 Sino- prefix from Latin meaning China-